Impact! (stylized as IMPACT!), also known as IMPACT! on AXS TV,
is an American professional wrestling television program produced by the American promotion Impact Wrestling (formerly known as Total Nonstop Action Wrestling (TNA)) that debuted on June 4, 2004. The series currently airs on AXS TV in the United States, owned by parent company Anthem Sports & Entertainment.

History

Fox Sports Net and Webcasts (2004–2005) 
In May 2004, TNA announced that they had negotiated a television deal with Fox Sports Net (FSN) where they would get a one-hour timeslot on Fridays in most markets, putting TNA on unrestricted cable and satellite for the first time. TNA began taping a new weekly series that month, TNA Impact!, with the first episode premiering on June 4, 2004.

After 51 shows TNA's contract with FSN expired in May 2005 and was not renegotiated, with the last episode of Impact! airing on May 27, 2005. Impact! continued to air on certain regional networks in place of Xplosion. On July 1, TNA began offering new episodes through their website, first using BitTorrent downloads, then by streaming through RealPlayer. To save on production costs, four hours of the show were recorded in a day and made available throughout the subsequent month.

The Spike TV era (2005–2014) 

Seeking a more profitable television outlet, TNA negotiated a Saturday night timeslot with Spike TV (now known as the Paramount Network) and started airing Impact! on October 1, 2005, five days after the departure of WWE Raw to USA Network, which re-debuted two days later. Two episodes were taped every other Tuesday, airing them on the subsequent Saturday. TNA's syndication contracts for the show on local television channels, from after the FSN contract, were converted to contracts for their syndicated show, TNA Xplosion. They were no longer paying for the timeslot, though Spike controlled their advertising revenue. Because of viewership growth, Impact! was moved to Thursdays in April 2006, and later to an earlier primetime slot in November. At this time tapings were moved from Tuesdays to Mondays. In June 2006, episodes became available at the iTunes Store, though they have since been removed.

Expansion to two hours (2007–2010) 
Due to further viewership growth, Impact! was expanded to two hours on October 4, 2007, still starting at the same time of 9:00 p.m. On January 17, 2008, Spike presented an event entitled "Global Impact!", which featured TNA wrestlers in matches against talents from New Japan Pro-Wrestling and on March 27, 2008, Impact! aired live for the first time in the show's history in its regular timeslot. Announced in a release on TNAwrestling.com on April 2, 2008, TNA came to terms on a deal that had the show airing in Australia starting April 5. Up until then, they had only broadcast their monthly pay-per-view events on Main Event in Australia. The contract expired in March 2011 and was not renewed, however, in May 2011, the show was picked up by Australian Network FuelTV, which began airing it every Saturday at 8:30 p.m. AEST, starting on June 11. On October 23, 2008, TNA aired its first Impact! filmed outside the Impact Zone in Orlando, Florida. It was broadcast from The Joint in the Hard Rock Hotel and Casino in Las Vegas, Nevada. TNA also made the transition to HD for this broadcast and announced that all future episodes would be broadcast in High Definition.

Move to Mondays (2010) 

On January 4, 2010, the show went head-to-head for the first time with TNA's rival-promotion WWE's flagship show Raw. This would be the first time since March 2001 that two major wrestling promotions went head-to-head in a Monday night television ratings competition. TNA advertised the debut of Hulk Hogan and his return to professional wrestling, while WWE promoted the return of Bret Hart to Raw, who last made an appearance in November 1997 before the Montreal Screwjob. On this night, Impact! was watched by more than 3 million viewers for the opening hour, towards the end of the show, the viewership declined to 2.2 million viewers, this was the highest viewership in the show's history; Raw was watched by 5.6 million viewers, the most since August 2009.

Impact! was permanently moved to Monday nights on March 8, 2010. The show would air live on a bi-weekly basis and be taped for the following week. On the edition of March 8, Impact! debuted their new theme song. Beginning with the show of April 12, 2010, Impact! was aired at 8:00 p.m. Eastern on Spike TV. This change was made as a result of the increase in ratings from the show of March 29, 2010 (which aired at 9:00 p.m. Eastern) and the show of April 5, 2010 (which aired at 8:00 p.m. Eastern). The final Monday Impact! scored a 0.8 rating and was then moved back to Thursday nights, the reason for the return to Thursdays was due to reduced television audience figures on Mondays.

Return to Thursday Nights (2010–2011) 
The show returned to Thursday nights on Thursday, May 13, 2010. Commenting on the move on the TNA website, Brian J. Diamond (Spike TV's Senior Vice President of Sports and Specials) said, "The fans have spoken and with their input, we have determined the best time slot to maximize the TNA audience is on Thursday nights where we are confident it will be among the most-watched shows with young men". In the same announcement, TNA president Dixie Carter was quoted as saying, "Our fans made it clear that they preferred the Thursday night time period. By moving to Thursdays, this is a win/win opportunity for both TNA and the fans. We are looking forward to delivering what the fans are asking for".

On June 24, 2010, Spike TV expanded "TNA Thursdays" to three hours with the addition of TNA Reaction (stylized as TNA ReAction or, alternatively, as TNA ReACTION), which became a regular one-hour docu-series immediately preceding TNA iMPACT! from 8:00 p.m.–9:00 p.m. Eastern. ReAction focused on the stories and characters of TNA Wrestling and previewed the upcoming episode of TNA iMPACT! TNA Impact! was also re-branded as Thursday Night Impact due to its return to Thursdays. TNA Wrestling president Dixie Carter announced on January 13, 2011, that on February 24, 2011, TNA would be holding Impact! tapings at the Crown Coliseum in Fayetteville, North Carolina.

Re-branding to Impact Wrestling (2011–2014) 

On May 3, 2011, during the tapings of the May 12 episode of TNA Impact, the show would change its name to Impact Wrestling and adopt the slogan "Where Wrestling Matters". The show's color scheme would change from red and black to blue, white and gray, while the URL of TNA's website was also changed to impactwrestling.com. On July 11, 2011, it was announced that TNA would hold Impact Wrestling tapings on August 25 at the Von Braun Center in Huntsville, Alabama, on September 21 at the Knoxville Coliseum in Knoxville, Tennessee, and on October 26 at the Macon Coliseum in Macon, Georgia. On January 6, 2012, TNA announced the first international Impact Wrestling tapings would be taking place on January 28 at the Wembley Arena in London, England.

On May 17, 2012, TNA announced that Impact Wrestling would air live through the summer of 2012, starting on May 31, when the show moved to a new time slot at 8:00 p.m. ET. The live schedule was later extended first through September, and then through the rest of 2012. On January 31, 2013, TNA announced that they would begin taping Impact from different venues around the United States starting March 14, 2013, from the Sears Center in Chicago. TNA officially terminated its lease with Universal Studios in Orlando, Florida in late March 2013 and left the Impact Wrestling Zone.

On March 14, 2013, TNA introduced a new universal HD set which is used for all weekly programming. On May 30, 2013, Impact Wrestling went back to its old start time of 9:00 p.m. and in July 2013, TNA announced that they would broadcast five Impact Wrestling specials in 2013 starting July 18, 2013 with Destination X. This was followed by Hardcore Justice, No Surrender, Final Resolution and Turning Point. These specials replaced the PPV events of the same name following TNA changing their monthly PPV format to a quarterly model.

On October 24, 2013, TNA announced they would be returning to Universal Studios in Orlando, Florida on November 21, 2013 due to the high cost of production on the road. Impact tapings were filmed from soundstage 19, rather than at the original Impact Zone at soundstage 21, but there were still select tapings on the road from time to time, such as the Genesis Impact Wrestling special on January 16 and 23, 2014 from the Von Braun Center in Huntsville, Alabama. TNA also announced a new programming initiative called IMPACT365 - Where Action Never Ends, in which cameras provide unprecedented access to the lives of the TNA Superstars. This has been used to make announcements for upcoming shows and for starting new angles and storylines.

On January 30, 2014, for the first time, Impact Wrestling was broadcast live in the United Kingdom on Challenge before it aired in the United States. The show took place at The Hydro in Glasgow, Scotland. TNA announced that they will be changing soundstages at Universal Studios Florida again starting with the March 13, 2014 live broadcast of Impact Wrestling. The new soundstage will be soundstage 20. Soundstage 19 and 20 were only temporary venues for Impact Wrestling tapings. Since June 10, 2014 TNA has taped Impact Wrestling from The Sands Casino Event Center in Bethlehem, Pennsylvania and the Manhattan Center's Grand Ballroom in New York City. On July 17, 2014, after a poll made on the Impact Wrestling website, TNA brought back the six-sided ring permanently.

Final months on Spike (July–December 2014) 
On July 28, 2014, TMZ reported that Spike would not renew TNA's contract, which was due to expire in September. The decision was reportedly triggered by TNA's decision to bring writer Vince Russo back to the company as a consultant. However, Mike Johnson of PW Insider who first revealed that Russo was working for TNA insists that his involvement had nothing to do with the cancellation. TNA president Dixie Carter and Spike subsequently released independent statements claiming that negotiations were ongoing. On August 14, Carter announced that Impact Wrestling would move to Wednesday nights and on August 20 announced that Impact Wrestling would continue on Spike for the remainder of 2014, adding that negotiations were still on going. Spike spokesperson David Schwarz told The Christian Post that increasing competition from other sports programs prompted the move from Thursday nights. The show ceased airing new televised events after the edition of November 19 of Impact Wrestling, with the final episodes of 2014 being dedicated to Best of TNA clip shows, before resuming events on January 7, 2015 with a live show from The Manhattan Center's Grand Ballroom in New York City. The last episode of Impact Wrestling broadcast on Spike aired on December 24, 2014.

Post-Spike TV (2015–2017) 
On November 19, 2014, TNA announced that it had reached a deal with Discovery Communications to move its programming, including Impact Wrestling, to Destination America in January 2015. After premiering on Wednesday, January 7, Impact Wrestling moved to its permanent slot on Fridays on January 16.

Along with the move to Destination America, the show got a new logo, graphics package, theme music, and stage. Former WWE employee Josh Mathews was also added to the commentary team. A brand new weekly series hosted by Mike Tenay, Impact Wrestling: Unlocked, premiered on Saturday, January 17 and TNA Wrestling's Greatest Matches, a series featuring the best matches in the company's history, made its U.S debut on Saturday, January 10.  After switching timeslots numerous times, both shows were cancelled in May.

Also in May, Dave Meltzer of the Wrestling Observer Newsletter reported that Destination America had decided to cancel Impact Wrestling by late September 2015. TNA vehemently denied the report, stating: "These false statements constitute defamation and if necessary we will seek all legal remedies available to us."  The following week Destination America announced that they had signed a 26-week trial deal with Ring of Honor (ROH) that would see Ring of Honor Wrestling air as Impact Wrestling'''s lead-in which began on June 3. Impact Wrestling subsequently began airing on Wednesdays starting in June.

On June 3, D'Angelo Dinero officially joined Josh Mathews as a new addition to the commentary team for Impact Wrestling. In a September interview with Sports Illustrated, Dixie Carter indicated that Impact Wrestling would remain on Destination America for the rest of the year which ended on December 16, 2015.

On November 19, 2015, it was announced Impact Wrestling would air Tuesday nights on Pop beginning January 5, 2016. With the show's move to Pop, Impact Wrestling received new theme music ("Roustabout" by The Smashing Pumpkins' Billy Corgan), and a new stage. Impact Wrestling moved to Thursday night beginning July 21, 2016, to avoid airing directly opposite WWE SmackDown, which moved to Tuesdays.

 Anthem era (2017–present) 
In 2017, TNA was acquired by Anthem Sports & Entertainment and was subsequently rebranded as "Impact Wrestling" in March. Thus, the promotion and the television series would begin sharing the same name. On July 4, 2017, after the company briefly rebranded as Global Force Wrestling (GFW), the show's name was changed to GFW Impact! (or simply, Impact!).Welcome to GFW IMPACT, Jul 4, 2017  The GFW branding would be dropped in the October of that year, following the departure of Jeff Jarrett and the subsequent cancellation of the merger with Impact Wrestling.

In October 2018, Impact! moved to 10pm ET on Thursdays nights.

In January 2019, during Homecoming, it was announced that Impact!'s U.S broadcast would move to Pursuit Channel. The channel is partly owned by Anthem, with its ownership stake purchased in 2013, but was noted to have a significantly smaller subscriber base than Pop; Impact! would debut on Pursuit on January 11, 2019 to an average of 12,500 viewers. To compensate, Impact Wrestling expanded their previous agreement with Twitch to simulcast Impact! episode broadcasts online, beginning with the Pursuit Channel debut on January 11.

On September 9, 2019, Anthem purchased a majority stake in AXS TV. Shortly thereafter, it was announced that Impact! will move to AXS the following month, after Bound for Glory on October 20, 2019, and continue to simulcast on the company's Twitch channel. It was later announced that the show would move to Tuesday nights, with Impact premiering on October 29, 2019.

Due to the COVID-19 pandemic, all Impact! episode tapings would be held behind closed doors at Skyway Studios in Nashville, Tennessee, beginning in April 2020 with the two-part Rebellion special, which was taped from April 8 to 10, and broadcast from April 21 to 28. Beginning with Hard to Kill on January 16, 2021, until Slammiversary on July 17, 2021, crowd noises were piped-into Impact Wrestling programming.

In February 2021, Impact Wrestling announced the launch of a new one-hour preshow, Before the Impact (abbreviated as BTI), which premiered on February 16 on AXS TV in the U.S. BTI features news, recaps of previous episodes of Impact!, previews of the following episode, and an exclusive match. BTI would replace Xplosion, which was cancelled in March 2021. The two shows would crossover on the June 3 episodes, when Josh Alexander faced T. J. Perkins for the X Division Championship in Impact Wrestling's first-ever 60-minute Iron man match. The match began on BTI and concluded in the opening minutes of Impact!.

On March 25, 2021, it was announced that Impact! will be moving back to Thursday nights, starting on April 8, 2021.

On August 4, 2021, Impact Wrestling launched a new YouTube membership program called "Impact Wrestling Insiders". Subsequently, it was announced that the promotion had ended its partnership with Twitch; the final Twitch broadcast of Impact! aired on July 29.

 Broadcast history Impact! originally premiered on Fox Sports Net, where it remained until May 2005. The show began broadcasting episodes via syndication in limited markets on Urban America Television (replacing the syndicated show Xplosion) and on the Internet between June 24 and September 16, 2005.

The company would eventually secure a deal with Spike TV, with the first episode airing on October 1, 2005. Impact! first began airing episodes on Saturday nights, before later moving to Thursday nights in April 2006. The show would briefly move to Monday nights in 2010 before returning to Thursdays in the spring of 2010, where it remained until 2014.

In 2015, the show moved to Destination America, initially airing on Friday nights, before moving back to Wednesday nights on June 3, 2015, until its final broadcast on December 16, 2015.

From January 5, 2016, until January 4, 2019, Impact! aired weekly on Pop, with the show moving back to Thursday nights on July 21, 2016.

On January 11, 2019, Impact! moved to Friday nights on Pursuit Channel and Twitch; Impact would be simulcast on Twitch until the July 29, 2021 episode. On January 15, 2020, Impact's Twitch channel was banned after a sexually implicit segment involving Rob Van Dam was aired during that week's episode; the ban would be lifted on January 22.

Beginning October 29, 2019, Impact! moved to Tuesday nights on AXS TV. On March 25, 2021, Impact Wrestling announced on its website and social media accounts that Impact! would move back to Thursday nights starting April 8.

 Ratings 

 Production 
 Format 

Generally, the show features four to seven matches over the course of the two hours, as well as numerous interviews and segments interspersed between the matches. Due to the nature of the wrestling business, advertisements for merchandise and upcoming pay-per-view events often serve as bookends for the commercial segments.

When the show was on Fox Sports Net, all matches had a time limit (10 minutes for normal singles matches and 30 minutes for title matches) and the network's Fox Box was used. In the event of a time limit draw, the winner was determined by the NWA Championship Committee, a group consisting of three veteran stars. Since leaving the channel, Impact Wrestling discarded the time limit concept.

 Roster 

 Commentators 

 Special episodes 

 On-air personalities 

The show features various on-air personalities including the stars themselves, ring announcers, knockouts, commentators, and on-screen authority figures. Impact'' also has had various recurring on-air segments hosted by members of the roster.

Recurring segments

See also

List of professional wrestling television series

References

External links

https://www.twitch.tv/impactwrestling
https://www.fite.tv/channel/tna-impact-wrestling/

2004 American television series debuts
2010s American television series
2020s American television series
Impact Wrestling television shows
Destination America original programming
Spike (TV network) original programming
Pop (American TV channel) original programming
Wrestling Observer Newsletter award winners